John McDowall (25 February 1902 – 4 July 1936) was a British swimmer. He competed in the men's 100 metre backstroke event at the 1924 Summer Olympics.

Competitions
 9 May 1923, Paisley corporation baths, Paisley, Scotland - 100 yards Backstroke setting new record of 1min 57sec. 
 1923 Blackpool, England - Beat the reigning Amateur Swimming Association 150 yards backstroke champion Austin Rawlinson during the national 220 yards championship meeting.  
 1924 Olympics, Paris - Competed for UK in Mens 100m Backstroke. Came 5th in Semi-Finals.

Suspension
2 Feb 1929 Suspended for Life from ASA (Scotland) for participating in an unsanctioned gala at Stranraer.

References

External links
 

1902 births
1936 deaths
British male swimmers
Olympic swimmers of Great Britain
Swimmers at the 1924 Summer Olympics
Place of birth missing
British male backstroke swimmers
20th-century British people